Darryl Edwin Williams (born January 8, 1970) is an American former professional football player who was a safety in the National Football League (NFL) for ten seasons during the 1990s and early 2000s.  He played college football for the Miami Hurricanes, was recognized as an All-American, and was a member of two national championship teams.  He was drafted by the Cincinnati Bengals in the first round of the 1992 NFL Draft, and played professionally for the Bengals and the Seattle Seahawks.

Early years
Williams was born in Miami, Florida.  He attended American High School in Miami-Dade County, Florida, and played for the American Patriots high school football team.

College career
Williams received an athletic scholarship to attend the University of Miami in Coral Gables, Florida, where he played for coach Jimmy Johnson and coach Dennis Erickson's Hurricanes teams from 1988 to 1991.  He was a member of the Hurricanes' national championship teams in 1989 and 1991, and was recognized as a consensus first-team All-American in 1991.

Professional career

First stint with Bengals
During his first four seasons with the team he started 60 of 64 games in which he played, recording 402 tackles, nine interceptions, and 6.5 quarterback sacks.

Seattle Seahawks
In his second year with the team he made the Pro Bowl after recording 96 tackles and eight interceptions. Overall, he played four years for the Seahawks from 1996 to 1999 starting 60 of 61 games, recording 348 tackles and 20 interceptions. He was released by the Seahawks after the 1999 season.

Second stint with Bengals
Williams re-signed with the Bengals before the 2000 season.  He spent the next two years with the Bengals starting 17 of 31 games, recording 126 tackles, two interceptions, and 3.5 sacks.

After the 2001 season Williams retired after 10 years in the NFL.  He finished his career starting 137 of 156 games, and recorded 876 tackles, 31 interceptions, and 9.5 sacks.

NFL career statistics

See also
 1991 College Football All-America Team
 List of University of Miami alumni
 Miami Hurricanes
 Most consecutive starts by a free safety

References

1970 births
Living people
All-American college football players
American Conference Pro Bowl players
American football safeties
Cincinnati Bengals players
Miami Hurricanes football players
Players of American football from Miami
Seattle Seahawks players
American Senior High School (Miami-Dade County, Florida) alumni
Sports coaches from Miami